Pectinivalva anazona is a moth of the family Nepticulidae. It is found along the south-eastern coast of New South Wales.

The wingspan is about 4 mm for females.

The type species was found on Lophostemon confertus, but this is a doubtful host. They probably mine the leaves of their host plant.

External links
Australian Faunal Directory
Australian Nepticulidae (Lepidoptera): Redescription of the named species

Moths of Australia
Nepticulidae
Moths described in 1906
Taxa named by Edward Meyrick